Yair Netanyahu (born 26 July 1991) is an Israeli podcaster and son of Prime Minister Benjamin Netanyahu.

Biography
Yair Netanyahu was born  in Jerusalem to Benjamin Netanyahu and his wife Sara. He has a brother, Avner, and a half-sister, Noa Netanyahu-Roth; Noa is Benjamin Netanyahu's daughter by his first wife, Miriam Weizmann.

Netanyahu majored in Theatre at the High School for the Arts in Jerusalem before serving in the IDF Spokesperson's Unit. He previously worked as social media director for Shurat HaDin, an Israeli NGO that provides legal services to victims of terrorist attacks. After finishing his army service, Netanyahu studied international relations at the Hebrew University of Jerusalem, graduating with a Bachelor of Arts degree in International Relations. Netanyahu also studied at the Interdisciplinary Center (IDC) in Herzliya and graduated with a Master of Arts degree in Government Studies. Netanyahu lived with his parents at Beit Aghion, the prime minister's official residence in Rehavia, Jerusalem. They left after Netanyahu lost the election.

In January 2014, a Norwegian newspaper  reported that Netanyahu was dating Sandra Leikanger, a Norwegian student. The couple had met while they were students at the Interdisciplinary Center in Herzliya. The news triggered outrage because Leikanger was not Jewish. In 2015, Netanyahu briefly dated Lee Levi, a Danish-Israeli model and student.

Views and opinions
Netanyahu is known for defending his father on social media.
Netanyahu has also published his opinions in Breitbart News, an American far-right news and opinion website. In late 2017, Netanyahu posted a meme on Facebook portraying his father's political opponents as puppets controlled by George Soros; the meme garnered support from US white nationalists, including David Duke, and neo-Nazi website The Daily Stormer described itself as "The World’s #1 Yair Netanyahu fansite". Netanyahu later deleted the post following backlash.

In December 2018, he was suspended from Facebook for 24 hours after posting anti-Muslim content. One of Netanyahu's comments read: "There will never be peace with those monsters in the form of men that have called themselves ‘Palestinians’ since 1964".

In March 2019, he was asked to leave his work at the Israel Law Center, an NGO that provides legal services to terror victims, after criticizing President Reuven Rivlin for his efforts on behalf of Arab-Israeli coexistence.

In May 2019, Netanyahu expressed support for right-wing nationalist figures Viktor Orbán, Matteo Salvini, Nigel Farage and Geert Wilders in the 2019 European Parliament election. In the same month, some observers hypothesized that Netanyahu was looking for a job in the Ministry of Foreign Affairs, although Netanyahu has denied that he is looking for a political career. In June 2019, Netanyahu met with Katrina Pierson, a senior advisor for Donald Trump's 2020 presidential campaign.

In July 2019, Netanyahu expressed support for British anti-Islam activist Tommy Robinson, during the latter's imprisonment by British authorities.

In September 2019, Netanyahu accused former Israeli Prime Minister Yitzhak Rabin, who was assassinated in 1995, of having "murdered Holocaust survivors on the Altalena". The comments were disavowed by his father. He has compared Roni Alsheikh, the Israel Police chief who played a role in the Netanyahu corruption investigations, to the fictional mobster Tony Soprano. While being questioned by police during the investigations, Netanyahu called the police "Stasi" and "Gestapo" and said they were worse than the mafia. He also accused Nir Hafetz and Gideon Saar of various crimes.

In May 2020, the nationalist Alternative for Germany (AfD) party used a quote from Netanyahu in its campaign graphics. Following this, Netanyahu urged the AfD to work towards stopping German funding for NGOs operating in Israel.

In November 2020, Netanyahu launched his own right-wing podcast called The Yair Netanyahu Show, with episodes spoken in both English and Hebrew. His first guest was Brazilian politician Eduardo Bolsonaro, the third son of Brazilian President Jair Bolsonaro. In June 2022, Netanyahu received his journalist certificate from the Israeli Government Press Office.

Controversy
In January 2018, a scandal erupted when a recording of Netanyahu's visit to a Tel Aviv strip club in 2015 was leaked. In the recording, Netanyahu discussed strippers and referred to a controversial gas deal signed by his father. Netanyahu apologized for his remarks. He filed a lawsuit for 1 million NIS ($272,000) against his driver, who allegedly recorded the conversation.

On 7 July 2019, he won a libel suit against Israeli Labor Party activist Abie Binyamin for claiming that Netanyahu was hiding millions in offshore accounts.

In November 2019, Netanyahu was sued for slander after sharing a Facebook post claiming that former Walla news site editor, Avi Alkalay, was a plant for the Wexner Foundation. In February 2020, he was ordered to pay damages and legal costs totalling $81,000. Netanyahu appealed the decision, but his appeal was rejected by the Tel Aviv Magistrate's Court in July 2021.

References

External links
 
 
 
 

1991 births
Living people
Yair
Israeli political activists
Children of prime ministers of Israel
Hebrew University of Jerusalem Faculty of Social Sciences alumni
Breitbart News people
Far-right politics in Israel
Anti-Islam sentiment in Israel
Mass media people from Jerusalem
Podcasters